Gorybia amazonensis is a species of beetle in the family Cerambycidae. It was described by Martins and Galileo in 2010.

References

Piezocerini
Beetles described in 2010